Scott Horton is an American radio host and author.

Career
Horton hosts Antiwar Radio for Pacifica Radio's KPFK 90.7 FM in Los Angeles, as well as the podcast The Scott Horton Show. Horton has conducted over 5,000 interviews since 2003. He is also the director of the Libertarian Institute.

Horton is the editorial director of the non-interventionist news portal Antiwar.com. He was previously the host of Say It Ain't So on Free Radio Austin 97.1 FM, the Weekend Interview Show and the KAOS Report on Radio KAOS 95.9 FM, for which he won The Austin Chronicles Best of Austin award in 2007 for "Best Iraq War Coverage".

Horton's book Fool's Errand: Time to End the War in Afghanistan (2017) is an account of the War in Afghanistan since 2001, which argues that the United States should end its presence in the country.  The American Conservative described the work as a "masterful account of America’s prolonged Afghan engagement."

In 2019, Horton edited and published the collection of interviews The Great Ron Paul: The Scott Horton Show Interviews 2004–2019. In late 2019, Horton joined the Libertarian Party to support Jacob Hornberger’s presidential campaign.

In 2021, the Libertarian Institute published his book Enough Already: Time to End the War on Terrorism.

Personal life
Horton is married to investigative reporter Larisa Alexandrovna.

Works
 Fool's Errand: Time to End the War in Afghanistan (2017)
 The Great Ron Paul: The Scott Horton Show Interviews 2004–2019 (2019)
Enough Already: Time to End the War on Terrorism (2021)
 Hotter Than the Sun: Time to Abolish Nuclear Weapons (2022)

See also 

 Libertarianism in the United States
 List of peace activists

References

External links
 Appearances on C-SPAN
 Official website
 Full interview archive
 Scott Horton articles for Antiwar.com
 Scott Horton archives at The Libertarian Institute

Living people
21st-century American journalists
21st-century American male writers
21st-century American non-fiction writers
American anti-war activists
American foreign policy writers
American libertarians
American male journalists
American male non-fiction writers
American podcasters
American political journalists
American political writers
American radio journalists
California Libertarians
Journalists from California
Journalists from Texas
Non-interventionism
American opinion journalists
Texas Libertarians
Year of birth missing (living people)